The Belgium men's national under-18 ice hockey team is the men's national under-18 ice hockey team of Belgium. The team is controlled by the Royal Belgian Ice Hockey Federation, a member of the International Ice Hockey Federation. The team represents Belgium at the IIHF World U18 Championships.

International competitions

IIHF World U18 Championships

1999: 3rd in Division II Europe
2000: 4th in Division II Europe
2001: 5th in Division III
2002: 4th in Division III
2003: 4th in Division II Group A
2004: 6th in Division II Group A
2005: 2nd in Division III
2006: 4th in Division II Group A
2007: 4th in Division II Group A
2008: 4th in Division II Group A

2009: 3rd in Division II Group B
2010: 5th in Division II Group B
2011: 6th in Division II Group B
2012: 1st in Division III
2013: 4th in Division II Group B
2014: 4th in Division II Group B
2015: 4th in Division II Group B
2016: 5th in Division II Group B
2017: 6th in Division II Group B

External links
Belgium at IIHF.com

Ice hockey in Belgium
National under-18 ice hockey teams
Ice hockey